Testosterone butyrate, or testosterone butanoate, also known as androst-4-en-17β-ol-3-one 17β-butanoate, is a synthetic, steroidal androgen and an androgen ester – specifically, the C17β butanoate ester of testosterone – which was first synthesized in the 1930s and was never marketed. Its ester side-chain length and duration of effect are intermediate between those of testosterone propionate and testosterone valerate.

See also 
 Testosterone acetate
 Testosterone caproate
 Testosterone enanthate

References 

Abandoned drugs
Androgens and anabolic steroids
Androstanes
Butyrate esters
Prodrugs
Testosterone esters